Paisley North may refer to:

 Paisley North (UK Parliament constituency)
 Paisley North (Scottish Parliament constituency)

See also
 Paisley (disambiguation)